Agioi Anargyroi is a former municipality in Kastoria regional unit, Western Macedonia, Greece. Since the 2011 local government reform it is part of the municipality Kastoria, of which it is a municipal unit. The municipal unit has an area of 97.340 km2. Population 2,138 (2011). The seat of the municipality was in Korisos.

References

Former municipalities in Western Macedonia
Populated places in Kastoria (regional unit)